Nicoll Halsey (March 8, 1782 – March 3, 1865) was an American politician who served one term as a U.S. Representative from New York from 1833 to 1835.

He was the son of Silas Halsey and brother of Jehiel Howell Halsey.

Biography 
Born in Southampton, New York, Halsey moved to Herkimer County in 1793 with his parents, who settled in what is now the town of Lodi, New York.
He attended the common schools.
He moved to Tompkins County and settled near Trumansburg in 1808.

Career 
He engaged in agricultural pursuits and milling.
Supervisor for Ulysses, New York in 1812, 1814, 1815, 1818, 1821, and 1826.
He served as member of the State assembly in 1816 and again in 1824.
Sheriff of Tompkins County 1819–1821.

Congress 
Halsey was elected as a Jacksonian to the Twenty-third Congress (March 4, 1833 – March 3, 1835).
He was not a candidate for renomination in 1834.

Later career and death 
He was appointed judge of the Tompkins County Court on February 11, 1834.
He resumed the milling business.

He died while on a visit in Marshall, Michigan, March 3, 1865.
He was interred in Grove Cemetery, Trumansburg, New York.

References

1782 births
1865 deaths
Jacksonian members of the United States House of Representatives from New York (state)
People from Southampton (town), New York
People from Lodi, New York
People from Tompkins County, New York
People from Trumansburg, New York
19th-century American politicians
Members of the United States House of Representatives from New York (state)